Moshikou station is a subway station under construction on Line 11 of the Beijing Subway. It is expected to open in 2023.

History 
The original project name of this station is Jindingjie station. On September 25, 2020, the Beijing Municipal Commission of Planning and Natural Resources announced the 'Notice on the Naming Plan for Stations Along the Western Section of Rail Transit Line 11 Project', with plans to rename Jindingjie station to Moshikou station. On November 18, 2020, the station was officially renamed as Moshikou station.

The station was capped on June 2, 2021, before passing project acceptance inspection on November 15 in the same year.

Platform layout
The station has 2 underground side platforms.

References 

Railway stations under construction in China
Beijing Subway stations in Shijingshan District